Chavarria or Chavarría may refer to:

Surname
Chavarria, a surname of Basque origin stemming from Echevarria, a variant of this form includes "Chavarri"

Places
Chavarría, Argentina

People with the surname
Anton Abad Chavarria (born 1958), Catalan poet and singer-songwriter
Casiano Chavarría, Bolivian footballer
Daniel Chavarría (1933–2018), Uruguay revolutionary and writer, living in Cuba
Germán Chavarría (born 1958), Costa Rican footballer
Jaime Quesada Chavarría, (born 1971), Spanish footballer
Jorge Rossi Chavarría, (1922–2006), Costa Rican politician
Kyle Chavarria (born 1995), American teen actress
Luis Chavarría (born 1970), Chilean footballer
Ossie Chavarria (born 1937), former Major League Baseball player
Pablo Chavarría (born 1988), Argentine footballer

See also
Echevarria (disambiguation)
Etxeberria